The Aurora Protocol is a link layer communications protocol for use on point-to-point serial links. Developed by Xilinx, it is intended for use in high-speed (gigabits/second and more) connections internally in a computer or in an embedded system. It uses either 8b/10b encoding or 64b/66b encoding.

The Aurora 8B/10B protocol specification states: "The Aurora 8B/10B protocol is an open standard and is available for implementation by anyone without restriction.", there is no such clear statement in the Aurora 64B/66B protocol specification.

External links 
 Official Document (8b/10b)
 Official Document (64b/66b)
 Aurora 8b/10b IP Core from A.L.S.E.
 Aurora 64B/66B IP Core from A.L.S.E.

Serial buses
Link protocols